Trauger may refer to:
Trauger, Pennsylvania, a community in Westmoreland, Pennsylvania
5968 Trauger, an asteroid
Aleta Arthur Trauger, a United States federal judge